Tetsuya Komuro Archives refers to two separate box set releases featuring songs from various artists that were produced by the retired Japanese musician Komuro Tetsuya. They were released on June 27, 2018 by the Japanese record label Avex Trax. The box sets were released as Tetsuya Komuro Archives "T" and Tetsuya Komuro Archives "K", with each box set containing fifty songs divided into four separate discs.

Another box set containing both releases titled "Tetsuya Komuro Archives Box" was released by Sony Music Japan on the same day. It contained a bonus disc.

Tetsuya Komuro Archives "T" 

Tetsuya Komuro Archives "T" is the first of the two box sets of songs by various artists that were produced by the retired Japanese musician Komuro Tetsuya. It was released alongside its companion box set Tetsuya Komuro Archives "K" on June 27, 2018 by Avex Trax. The box set debuted at the third spot of the Oricon Weekly Charts with 34,305 copies sold on its first week of release.

Track list 
Disc 1
 Miss Orange Shock - Itoshino Rina
 Speedway - Oh! Mistake
 Yukiko Okada - Sweet Planet
 Watanabe Misato - My Revolution
 Watanabe Misato - Teenage Walk
 Nakayama Miho - JINGI Aishite Moraimasu
 Hori Chiemi - Ai wo Ima Shinjite Itai
 TM Network - Get Wild
 Matsuda Seiko - Kimono Beat
 Nakayama Miho - 50/50
 Watanabe Misato - Kanashii ne
 TM Network - BEYOND THE TIME (Mebiusu no Uchū (sora) o Koete)
 Koizumi Kyoko - Good Morning-Call

Disc 2
 Amuro Namie - Body Feels Exit
 Sakamoto Ryuichi + Tetsuya Komuro - VOLTEX OF LOVE
 Globe - DEPARTURES (RADIO EDIT)
 Kahara Tomomi - I'm Proud (Radio Edit)
 Amuro Namie - Don't wanna cry
 Dos - Baby baby baby
 H Jungle With T - FRIENDSHIP
 Hitomi - In the future
 Kahara Tomomi -LOVE BRACE
 Hitomi 「by myself (STRAIGHT RUN)」
 Oga Tadashi - Close to the night
 Globe - Can't Stop Fallin' in Love (STRAIGHT RUN)
 Tsukubo Tsuburaya - Mystery of Sound (Original Mix)

Disc 3
 TK PRESENTS Konetto - YOU ARE THE ONE
 Amuro Namie - Can You Celebrate?
 Taeco - deep GRIND (STRAIGHT RUN)
 Komuro Tetsuya - SPEED TK RE-MIX
 Suzuki Ami  - love the island
 Tohko - Fuwafuwa no Kawa
 Mirai Rei - Umi to Anata no Monogatari
 TRUE KISS DESTiNATiON -  Girls, be ambitious! (Straight Run)
 AN-J - Egao ga Mieru basho (I Wanna Go)
 Suzuki Ami  - Be Together (Original Mix)
 BALANCe - GET INTO YOU SUDDENLY
 Hamasaki Ayumi + KEIKO - A Song Was Born

Disc 4
 a-nation's party - THX A LOT (Album Version)
 AAA - Charge & Go!
 TM Network - I am
 Hamasaki Ayumi - You & Me
 SUPER GiRLS - Celebration (Music Ribbon ver.)
 Komuro Tetsuya - The Generation feat. Zeebra, DABO, SIMON
 Komuro Tetsuya vs. Hyadain - 22 Seiki-e no Kakehashi
 Komuro Tetsuya - EDM TOKYO 2014 feat. KOJI TAMAKI
 DiVA - DISCOVERY
 tofubeats - Throw your laptop on the fire (feat. Komuro Tetsuya) 
 Komuro Tetsuya feat. Kanda Sayaka (TRUSTRICK) & tofubeats - Hashtag RUN
 Dream 5 - Futuristic

Charts and sales

Tetsuya Komuro Archives "K" 

Tetsuya Komuro Archives "K" is the second of the two box sets of songs by various artists that were produced by the retired Japanese musician Komuro Tetsuya. It was released alongside its companion box set Tetsuya Komuro Archives "T" on June 27, 2018 by Avex Trax. The box set debuted at the fourth spot of the Oricon Weekly Charts with 33,530 copies sold on its first week of release.

Track list 

Disc 1
 TM Network - Seven Days War
 Rie Miyazawa - Dream Rush
 Tetsuya Komuro - RUNNING TO HORIZON
 Minako Tanaka - Yume Mite Try
 Hiromi Go -  Sora wo Toberu Kodomotachi
 Tetsuya Komuro - Eien to Nadzukete Daydream
 Alisa Mizuki - Too Shy Shy Boy!
 TRF - EZ DO DANCE (7" MIX)
 Makise Riho Kokkyō ni Chikai Ai no Uta
 Akina Nakamori - Aibu
 TRF - Survival Dance: No No Cry More (original single chart mix)」
 TRF - BOY MEETS GIRL (RADIO ON AIR MIX)
 Ryoko Shinohara with T. Komuro - Itoshisa to Setsunasa to Kokoro Tsuyosa to

Disc 2
 Ryoko Shinohara with T. Komuro - Motto Motto...
 TRF - Overnight Sensation: Jidai wa Anata ni Yudaneteru (Original Mix)
 H Jungle With t - WOW WAR TONIGHT: Tokini wa Okoseyo Movement (2 Million Mix)
 Hitomi - Candy Girl (Original Mix)
 Yuki Uchida - Only You (Original Mix)
 Geisha Girls - Honō no Meeting
 Midori Rei - Koi o Suru Tabi ni Kizutsuki Yasuku...
 H Jungle With t - GOING GOING HOME (Original Mix)
 Hitomi - GO TO THE TOP (ORIGINAL MIX)
 Ryoko Shinohara - Lady Generation (Original Mix)
 Globe - Feel Like dance (ORIGINAL MIX)
 H.A.N.D. - Prime High
 Tomomi Kahara - I Believe (Radio Edit)

Disc 3
 Kumi Koda and BoA - The Meaning of Peace
 Tomiko Van - Again
 Kaori Mochida In Case of Me
 Halna - DO OVER AGAIN
 Globe - Many Classic Moments (Original Mix)
 Gaball - Shiawase no Hyōgen (featuring Joanne)
 AAA - Aitai Riyū
 Mori Shinichi - Nemuranai Love Song
 Choshinsei - Evidence of Luv
 Kitano Kii - Hanataba
 Hamasaki Ayumi - Crossroad
 Komuro Tetsuya - Vienna (feat. Miu Sakamoto & KREVA)

Disc 4
 X21 - Yakusoku no Oka
 Komuro Tetsuya + Tsunku feat. May J. - Have Dreams!
 BiSH - Earth
 Def Will - Lovely Day
 Ōmori Yasuko - Positive Stress
 AOA - WOW WAR TONIGHT: Tokini wa Okoseyo Movement (girls ver.)
 Hikakin & Seikin - YouTube Theme Song (Tetsuya Komuro Rearrange)
 TRIGGER - DAYBREAK INTERLUDE
 PANDORA feat. Beverly - Be The One
 LaLuce - Kazeyofuke!
 Umeda Ayaka - My History
 Tetsuya Komuro feat. Beverly - Guardian

Charts and sales

Tetsuya Komuro Archives Box 
Sony Music Japan has re-released the two box sets from Avex Trax under the title Tetsuya Komuro Archives Box on the same day of the box sets' release, June 27, 2018, and it featured a bonus disc featuring fourteen additional songs released between 1989 and 1997 (product code DQCL-3458).

Track list 
 TM Network - Get Wild '89
 Watanabe Misato - Moonlight Dance
 Miyazawa Rie - No Titlist
 Tokyo Performance Doll - Kisu wa Shōnen o Rōhi Suru
 TMN - Love Train
 Watanabe Misato - BELIEVE
 Utsunomiya Takashi - Discovery (Original Mix)
 Komuro Tetsuya - 50/50
 Kai Yoshihiro - Against the Wind
 TRUE KiSS DESTiNATiON - AFRiCA (Original)
 TM Network - Self Control
 Suzuki Ami - Alone in My Room
 Hakuryū - Take a Deep breath

References 

Tetsuya Komuro
2018 albums
Avex Group compilation albums
Dance music compilation albums
Pop compilation albums